Geumdaebong is a mountain in the province of Gangwon-do, in South Korea. Its area extends over the cities of Taebaek, Samcheok and the county of Jeongseon.

See also
 List of mountains in Korea

Notes

References
 

Mountains of South Korea
Mountains of Gangwon Province, South Korea
One-thousanders of South Korea
zh:金台峰